Hesperonychus (meaning "western claw") was a small, carnivorous dinosaur. It was a member of the family Dromaeosauridae, along with its larger relatives Deinonychus and Velociraptor. There is one described species, Hesperonychus elizabethae. The type species was named in honor of Dr. Elizabeth Nicholls of the Royal Tyrrell Museum of Palaeontology who collected it as a student in 1982. It is known from fossils recovered from the lowermost strata of the Dinosaur Park Formation of Alberta, dating to the late Cretaceous  (Campanian stage) about 76.5 million years ago.

Description

Hesperonychus is known from one partial pelvic girdle, holotype specimen UALVP 48778, collected by  Dr. Elizabeth Nicholls in Dinosaur Provincial Park in 1982. The fossil remained undescribed, however, until Nick Longrich and Phil Currie published on it in 2009. A number of very small toe bones, including "sickle claws", in the collection of the Royal Tyrrell Museum also belong to Hesperonychus. The gracile appearance of these toe bones makes it unlikely that they belonged to a member of Eudromaeosauria. Despite their small size, the pubic bones were fused, a characteristic of adult dinosaurs, indicating that the specimen does not represent a juvenile of a known species.

Classification

A phylogenetic analysis performed by Longrich and Currie found Hesperonychus to be a member of the Microraptorinae, a clade of small dromaeosaurids previously thought to be restricted to the Early Cretaceous of Asia. The authors described this find as "remarkable"; the previously youngest known microraptorine was Microraptor itself from the Aptian stage of the Early Cretaceous, so the discovery of Hesperonychus in the Late Cretaceous Campanian stage pushed the fossil range of microraptorines forward by 45 million years. While the Late Cretaceous, North American Bambiraptor had sometimes been classified as a microraptorine, more recent studies (including those by Longrich and Currie) have found that it is more closely related to Saurornitholestes.

Hesperonychus was assigned to Microraptoria due to having a spatulate (rounded) pubic symphysis, a strong posterior curvature of the distal shaft of the pubis, and lateral tubercules on the pubes (which are expanded into 'wing-like' structures in the case of Hesperonychus).

Cladogram (2012):

Paleobiology
Microraptorines are well known for their small size and, in some cases, ability to fly or glide. Longrich and Currie concluded that it was unlikely for Hesperonychus to exhibit four wings or gliding behavior as in Microraptor, and speculated that it was more likely to be similar to Sinornithosaurus given their closer similarity in size. Nevertheless, Hesperonychus seems to show that microraptorines did not vary much in size, remaining very small relative to other dromaeosaurids throughout their history.

Aside from extending the known range of microraptorines, the discovery of Hesperonychus filled in a gap in the ecology of Late Cretaceous North America. Unlike roughly contemporary environments in Europe and Asia, North America appeared to lack very small carnivorous dinosaurs. In modern ecosystems dominated by endothermic mammals, small animal species outnumber larger ones. Since dinosaurs are also presumed to have been endotherms, the lack of small species and great number of known large species in North America was unusual. Hesperonychus helped to fill that gap, especially since, given the number of fragmentary remains and claws that have been collected (representing at least ten distinct specimens, compared to thirty of the contemporary Saurornitholestes and two of Dromaeosaurus), it appears to have been a very common feature of the Dinosaur Park Formation environment.

The next smallest carnivore in the environment was the mammal Eodelphis, which weighed only 600 grams. There does not appear to have been any overlap between the smallest dinosaurs and the largest mammals in ecosystems such as this, which Longrich and Currie explained by hypothesizing that either competition from dinosaurs kept mammals from growing larger (the traditional view), competition from mammals kept the dinosaurs from growing smaller, or both.

See also

 Timeline of dromaeosaurid research
 2009 in paleontology

References

Late Cretaceous dinosaurs of North America
Microraptorians
Fossil taxa described in 2009
Taxa named by Philip J. Currie
Dinosaur Park fauna
Oldman fauna
Paleontology in Alberta
Campanian genus first appearances
Campanian genus extinctions